CMV may refer to:

Technology
 Chevrolet CMV, a van
 Continuous mandatory ventilation
 Coromandel Aerodrome, IATA airport designator
 Former UK Cruise & Maritime Voyages
 Grizzly Combat Mobility Vehicle

Viruses
 Cucumber mosaic virus, of the family Bromoviridae
 Cytomegalovirus, a genus in the family Herpesviridae

Other
 Commercial Motor Vehicle
905 in Roman numerals
 r/changemyview, a subreddit